Chapter Two is the second album by the American soul singer Roberta Flack. It was released in 1970 by Atlantic Records.

Track listing

Side one
"Reverend Lee" (Gene McDaniels) – 4:31
"Do What You Gotta Do" (Jimmy Webb) – 4:09
"Just Like a Woman" (Bob Dylan) – 6:14
"Let It Be Me" (Gilbert Bécaud, Mann Curtis, Pierre Delanoë) – 5:00

Side two
"Gone Away" (Donny Hathaway, Leroy Hutson, Curtis Mayfield) – 5:16
"Until It's Time for You to Go" (Buffy Sainte-Marie) – 4:57
"The Impossible Dream" (Joe Darion, Mitch Leigh) – 4:42
"Business Goes on as Usual" (Fred Hellerman, Fran Minkoff) – 3:30

Personnel
 Roberta Flack – vocals, piano
 Eumir Deodato – conductor, horn arrangements, string arrangements
 Joel Dorn – arranger, producer
 Eric Gale – guitar
 Donny Hathaway – piano, arranger, background vocals
 Marshall Hawkins, Terry Plumeri, Chuck Rainey – bass guitar
 King Curtis – arranger, background vocals, producer
 Ray Lucas, Bernard Sweetney – drums
 Gene McDaniels – background vocals
 Warren Smith – percussion
 Chauncey Welsch, Ernie Royal, Frank Wess, Garnett Brown, George Marge, John Frosk, John Glasel, Trevor Lawrence – horns
 Hubert Laws, Joe Gentle – alto & bass flute
 Corky Hale – harp
 John Swallow – euphonium
 Alfred Brown, Arnold Black, Emanuel Green, Gene Orloff, Harry Lookofsky, Joe Malin, Kermit Moore, Leo Kahn, Lewis Eley, Max Kahn, Max Pollikoff, Noel Dacosta, Peter Buonconsiglio, Peter Dimitriades, Raoul Poliakin, Sanford Allen, Selwart Clarke, Seymour Myroff, Tosha Samaroff – strings
Technical
Lew Hahn - recording and remix engineer
Ira Friedlander - album design
Jack Robinson - cover photography

Charts

Weekly charts

Year-end charts

References

Roberta Flack albums
1970 albums
Atlantic Records albums
Albums conducted by Eumir Deodato
Albums arranged by Eumir Deodato
Albums arranged by Joel Dorn
Albums arranged by Donny Hathaway
Albums arranged by King Curtis
Albums produced by King Curtis
Albums produced by Joel Dorn
Jazz albums by American artists
Gospel albums by American artists